The Poland–Czechoslovakia War, also known mostly in Czech sources as the Seven-day war was a military confrontation between Czechoslovakia and Poland over the territory of Cieszyn Silesia in early 1919.

After a vain protest by the Czechoslovak government against action in breach of the Interim Agreement, they attacked the part of Cieszyn Silesia held by Polish forces to prevent elections to the Polish Sejm in the disputed territory and the local population's contributions to the Polish army. The Czechoslovak army made rapid advancements, capturing most of Cieszyn Silesia by the end of January. The bulk of the Polish army was engaged in the Polish–Ukrainian War at the time, and the Polish forces faced a numerically superior and better equipped Czech Army in Cieszyn Silesia.
The attack was halted under pressure from the Entente. The result of the war was the new demarcation line, which expanded the territory controlled by Czechoslovakia. It led to the division of the region of Cieszyn Silesia in July 1920, and left a substantial Polish minority in Czechoslovakia in the region later called Zaolzie. The division of Cieszyn Silesia did not satisfy Poland and led to the Polish annexation of Zaolzie in 1938.

Background
During the final months of World War I, Polish and Czechoslovak diplomats met to hammer out a common border between the two new countries. By the time the armistice was declared, most of the border was worked out except for three small politically sensitive areas in Upper Silesia and Upper Hungary which were claimed by both countries.

Cieszyn Silesia or the Duchy of Teschen ( and ) was a small area in south-eastern Silesia. The Duchy was part of the historic Czech lands of Bohemian Crown - Crown of Saint Wenceslaus (born Václav). Latin, German, Czech, Moravian and finally Polish served as an official language of the region, however throughout the ages many historical sources suggested the local population remained mostly Polish-speaking in the form of the Cieszyn Silesian dialect, regardless of the official language.
The last Austrian census of 1910 (determining nationality according to the main communication language of the respondents) showed that it was predominantly Polish-speaking in three districts (Cieszyn (Teschen), Bielsko (Bielitz), and Fryštát (Freistadt)) and mainly Czech-speaking in the fourth district of Frýdek (Friedek). Part of the population (the Ślązakowcy – named after the newspaper Ślązak, Schlonsaken) claimed a distinct, Silesian identity, however never fully denying the old Polish roots of the local population or the status the local dialect as a dialect of the Polish language (which they used in their newspapers), but rather gradually becoming superior to the Polish culture in the Kingdom of Poland, thanks to becoming part of the German cultural sphere.

The chief importance of Cieszyn Silesia was the rich coal basin around Karviná and the valuable Košice-Bohumín Railway line which linked the Czech lands with Slovakia. Furthermore, in north-western Cieszyn Silesia the railroad junction of Bohumín served as a crossroad for international transport and communications. The leaders of Czechoslovakia had insisted most forcefully on the indivisibility of the former Austrian Crownlands of Bohemia, Moravia and Silesia and their unwillingness to compromise on Cieszyn Silesia was mostly due to their desire to keep the Sudetenland region in Czechoslovakia. To allow Cieszyn Silesia to join Poland because it had a Polish majority would create a precedent for the German-speaking Sudetenland to join Germany, and it was largely for this reason the Czechoslovak government insisted that all of the former Duchy of Teschen was part of Czechoslovakia. The Czech argument was that the Poles were not local but an incoming population, and that the indigenous population had been Czech, they claimed Poles were immigrants attracted to employment in coal mines throughout the 18th century. Those claims were not corroborated by Austrian population censuses throughout the 19th century. The influx of Poles from Galicia was directed mainly to Ostrava and surroundings, which lie outside of Cieszyn Silesia. Moreover, the Polish national movement in the region was active since the Spring of Nations in 1848, whereas the influx of Galician Poles began in 1870s.

On 5 November 1918, the Polish National Council and the Czechoslovak Committee concluded an agreement on the demarcation line for administrative and military purposes, and divided their respective spheres of influences at the municipal level, roughly along the ethnic lines. The Frýdek district and a small part of the Fryštát district was left on the Czech side, the remainder was accorded to the Poles.

Forces

The Czechoslovak side was led by Josef Šnejdárek. Czechoslovak military forces had been formed from the three legionnaire battalions of the 21st Rifle   Regiment from France, the 54th Infantry Battalion of Olomouc, the 93rd Infantry Battalion of Fryštát, a volunteer battalion from Bohumín and a volunteer battalion from Orlová. The operations of the Czechoslovak forces were joined by other local volunteers, formed in the National Guard approximately 5,000 men strong. From the north-west of Slovakia came the main force that was sent to support the 35th Regiment from Italy, led by the Italian Colonel Graselli and later reinforced with the Rifle Regiment from Italy. During the war the Czechoslovak army was reinforced by the newly formed 2nd Brigade with a strength of six battalions, with the support of two artillery batteries, and one cavalry squadron.

The Czechoslovak army was further strengthened by the 1st Battalion of the 28th Infantry Regiment, 1st Btn. of the 3rd Infantry Reg., 2nd Btn of the 93rd Infantry Reg. and 5 volunteer battalions.

Polish forces under the command of Franciszek Latinik were weaker than the Czechoslovak forces. At the end of World War I, Poland was fighting in border disputes with all its neighbors, and during the war with Czechoslovakia the main force was committed to the fighting in Eastern Galicia with the Ukrainians. The Polish forces were composed of six infantry battalions, two cavalry squadrons and an artillery battery. Other forces included approximately 550 members of the gendarmerie and around 4,000 (Polish claim) to 6,500 (Czech claim) local Polish volunteers. Polish forces were reinforced during the war.

Battle

On 23 January 1919 at 11:00 in Cieszyn Silesia Polish commander Franciszek Latinik and Czechoslovak officer Josef Šnejdárek met with a group of officers, consisting of British, French, Italian and U.S. representatives (at the request of the Czechoslovak party). The Polish side was given an ultimatum, that they evacuate the area to the Biała River in less than two hours. After the expiry of this period, the Czechoslovak army started its operations at 13:00 following its operational guidelines to seize Bohumín/Bogumin and Karviná/Karwina. From the east, at the same time, an attack was launched by the Italian legionnaire unit. The Czechoslovak army moved forward, and took Bohumín (at 16:00), Orlová/Orłowa and Karviná/Karwina. Cieszyn Silesia was taken over by Czechoslovak forces on 27 January 1919. Polish troops retreated to the Vistula river.

On 30 January 1919 Josef Šnejdárek received the order to cross the Vistula and secure the railway line between Bohumín and Jablunkov/Jabłonków. They crossed the river and the Polish troops retreated to Skoczów, where the front line was stalled. Further Czechoslovak reinforcements arrived, which gave Šnejdárek an advantage over the Polish units. The Czechoslovak army prepared for an attack on Skoczów assuming that it would lead to the collapse of the Polish defenses.

On 31 January 1919, because of the pressure from the Triple Entente representatives, the attack on Skoczów was cancelled, and the Czechoslovak army ceased fighting. The Czechoslovak army withdrew to the new Green Line, established by the International Commission Agreement on the basis of the Czechoslovak–Polish Treaty, concluded on 3 February 1919 in Paris.

Conclusion
The disputed territory was placed under international control. The final division of Cieszyn Silesia came in July 1920 as a result of the Spa Conference. In conclusion, the railway line connecting the Czech lands with Slovakia and the territory to the south of it were assigned to Czechoslovakia, while the territory north of the railway line was assigned to Poland. Vast majority of the coal mines, as well as Třinec Iron and Steel Works were on the territory assigned to Czechoslovakia.

In precise terms, Poland was assigned one-third of the population (142,000 out of 435,000), less than half of the territory (1002 km2 out of 2222), and the town of Cieszyn. Czechoslovakia received the districts of Fryštát and Frýdek, most of the area of the district of Cieszyn, the railway station of Cieszyn, Karviná and coal mines, Třinec with ironworks, and the whole Bohumín-Jablunkov railway line. Some 140,000 Poles were left on the Czech side.

War crimes
On 26 January, Czechoslovak forces killed 20 Polish POWs in the village Stonava, which has been documented on photos. According to some sources, they were bayonetted to death. A monument has been erected in their memory in Stonava. 
According to Polish claims an unspecified number of Polish POWs were also killed in the village of Bystřice and a number of civilians killed in Karviná. Several thousand people were forced to flee to Poland, who returned in 1938 with the Polish annexation of Zaolzie and in turn started taking revenge on the local Czech populace. There is a monument in Orlová, commemorating the Czech victims of the war.

Footnotes

References
 Clodfelter, M. (2017). Warfare and Armed Conflicts: A Statistical Encyclopedia of Casualty and Other Figures, 1492-2015 (4th ed.). Jefferson, North Carolina: McFarland. .
 Davies, Norman. Polsko. Dějiny národa ve středu Evropy. Praha : Prostor, 2003. .
 
 Gawrecki, Dan. Studie o Těšínsku 15. Politické a národnostní poměry v Těšínském Slezsku 1918–1938. Český Těšín : Muzeum Těšínska, 1999. .
 
 Kolektiv autorů: Stonawa pamięta: 1919–1999, Interfon (1999), Těšín, 
 Matroszová, Veronika. Českoslovenští legionáři, rodáci a občané okresu Karviná. Praha: Státní okresní archiv Karviná, 2005. .
 
 

Conflicts in 1919
Cieszyn Silesia
Wars involving Poland
Wars involving Czechoslovakia
Territorial disputes of Czechoslovakia
1919 in Poland
1919 in Czechoslovakia
Czechoslovakia–Poland relations
January 1919 events